Transmutation is the second full-length album of the Brazilian death metal band Ophiolatry. It was released in 2008 by Regain Records and Forces of Satan Records, the label run by Infernus.

Track listing
All songs written and arranged by Ophiolatry, except where noted.
 "Parricide" – 01:53
 "Transmutation" – 02:13
 "Abyss of Alienation" – 03:15
 "Divine Stigma" – 01:55
 "Nominating the Oxen" – 02:02
 "Cauterization" – 02:05
 "Urutu" – 01:11
 "The Ghost" – 01:59
 "Neuropsychoperverse" – 01:13
 "Variações 1" – 01:07
 "Art of War" – 02:00
 "G.O.D.?" – 00:52
 "Eradicating the Paradigm" – 02:42
 "Diabolism" – 01:50
 "Sub-Race" – 02:23
 "Prelúdio No 4" – 03:13 (Heitor Villa-Lobos)

Personnel
Antonio Cozta – vocals, bass
Fabio Zperandio – acoustic and electric guitars, keyboards, programming
Jhorge "Dog" Duarte – drums

References

2008 albums
Forces of Satan Records albums
Ophiolatry (band) albums
Regain Records albums